Katrina "Kate" Lawrence (born 10 December 1983 in Scone, New South Wales) is an Australian slalom canoeist who competed at the international level from 2000 to 2012.

She won the overall World Cup title in the K1 class in 2008.

She has two sisters who have also competed in canoe slalom. Her older sister Jacqueline is an Olympic silver medalist (2008 Beijing Olympic Games) and her younger sister Rosalyn is two-time overall World Cup champion in C1.

World Cup individual podiums

1 Continental Cup Oceania counting for World Cup points
2 Oceania Championship counting for World Cup points

References

Australian female canoeists
Living people
1983 births